Yariguíes Airport is an airport serving Barrancabermeja, a city in the Santander Department of Colombia.

The Barrancabermeja VOR-DME (Ident: EJA) is located on the field.

The airport was renovated in 2013. The cost of renovation was $13 million pesos. Colombian president Juan Manuel Santos visited the airport to inaugurate the completed renovations.

Airlines and destinations

Climate 
Yariguíes Airport has a tropical monsoon climate (Am) with heavy rainfall in all months except January.

Accidents and incidents
On 21 May 1970, a Douglas DC-3 of Avianca was hijacked to Yariguíes Airport whilst on a flight from El Alcaraván Airport, Yopal to Alberto Lleras Camargo Airport, Sogamoso. The hijackers had demanded to be taken to Cuba.

See also
Transport in Colombia
List of airports in Colombia

References

External links 
Yariguíes Airport at OpenStreetMap
Yariguíes Airport at OurAirports

Airports in Colombia
Buildings and structures in Santander Department